John Bryant (born August 19, 1930) is an American sailor. He competed in the 5.5 Metre event at the 1956 Summer Olympics.

References

External links
 

1930 births
Living people
American male sailors (sport)
Olympic sailors of the United States
Sailors at the 1956 Summer Olympics – 5.5 Metre
Sportspeople from Philadelphia